Chadli Amri (born 14 December 1984) is a retired professional footballer who played as a striker. Born in France, he represented Algeria at international level

Early life
Amri was born in Saint-Avold, France, to Algerian parents. His family is originally from Laâchache, Tlemcen Province, Algeria.

Career
After leaving FC Metz's junior ranks, he played briefly at amateur club ASC Lascasbas before joining the reserve team of 1. FC Saarbrücken. After one season with the reserve team, he was called up to the senior squad and scored six goals in 25 games. The next summer he signed a four-year contract with then 2. Bundesliga side 1. FSV Mainz 05.  On 3 March 2010, his club announced that it would not renew the contract with the striker and that he would leave the club in summer. Amri then joined 1. FC Kaiserslautern.

On 15 December 2011, Amri was loaned out by Kaiserslautern to FSV Frankfurt until the end of the season. On 26 February 2012, in a league game against Karlsruher SC, Amri broke his leg after colliding with opposing goalkeeper Dirk Orlishausen, forcing him to miss the rest of the season.

Coaching career
At the end of November 2020, Stéphane Léoni was appointed manager of Luxembourgian club FC Progrès Niederkorn, with Amri being announced as his assistant. After difficult second part of the 2021-22 season, the duo left the club at the end of the campaign, one year before their contracts expired.

References

External links
 
 
 
 

Living people
1984 births
People from Saint-Avold
French sportspeople of Algerian descent
Sportspeople from Moselle (department)
French footballers
Algerian footballers
Association football forwards
Algeria international footballers
Algeria youth international footballers
FC Metz players
1. FC Saarbrücken players
1. FSV Mainz 05 players
1. FSV Mainz 05 II players
FSV Frankfurt players
MC Oran players
FC 08 Homburg players
FC Differdange 03 players
US Sarre-Union players
Bundesliga players
2. Bundesliga players
Regionalliga players
Algerian Ligue Professionnelle 1 players
Algerian expatriate footballers
Algerian expatriate sportspeople in Germany
French expatriate footballers
French expatriate sportspeople in Germany
Algerian expatriate sportspeople in Luxembourg
French expatriate sportspeople in Luxembourg
Expatriate footballers in Germany
Expatriate footballers in Luxembourg
Footballers from Grand Est